WMSR may refer to:

 WMSR (AM), a radio station (1320 AM) licensed to Manchester, Tennessee, United States
 WMSR-FM, a radio station (94.9 FM) licensed to Collinwood, Tennessee, United States
 WMSR - Redhawk Radio, a college radio station broadcasting from Miami University
 Western Maryland Scenic Railroad (WMSR), a heritage railroad based in Cumberland, Maryland, United States